Neapoli (also Neapolis) is a small town and a former municipality in Lasithi, eastern Crete, Greece. Since the 2011 local government reform it is part of the municipality Agios Nikolaos, of which it is a municipal unit.
In the period of the Venetian domination its two settlements were named "New Village". But when the seat of the Prefecture was transferred from Fourni to the “New Village” this was renamed to Neapolis. Neapolis was maintained as the capital of the prefecture of Lasithi till 1904. After that date Agios Nikolaos became the new capital.  The surrounding area is mountainous and home to a collection of native olive trees. Neapoli is a traditional Cretan town with narrow streets and cobbled roads. The Cathedral of the Virgin Mary (Megali Panagia) is located on the central square.

Annual festival

Annually on the 15th of August there is a holy festival dedicated to the Virgin Mary. The main square hosts musicians, traditional dancers, and a market. There are also some sports events including a cycling race around the hills of Lasithi. When it gets dark there is a procession of torches up the mountainside.

Museum of Local History

There is a small museum of local history comprising mostly photographs and postcards of Neapolis.
www.pleam.gr

Local produce

The town is surrounded by olive trees. Olives and olive oil are a very important part of the local agricultural economy.

There are also many almond trees. A traditional local product of Neapoli is a drink, made from almonds, called soumada. It is a very sweet almond-flavored, non-alcoholic, soft drink that can also be delicately flavored with flowers (providing variations of the aroma and the flavor).

Local wildlife

Whilst walking around the hills surrounding Neapoli, apart from the usual  tortoises, hare, goats, and xylophagidae (known more commonly in Greece as Tzitzikia), one can occasionally see eagles, hummingbirds, and scorpions. The scorpions are usually hiding under rocks.

Notable residents
Antipope Alexander V (also Peter of Candia or Peter Phillarges, ca. 1339 – May 3, 1410) was born in Neapoli. He reigned from June 26, 1409, to his death in 1410 and is officially regarded by the Roman Catholic Church as an antipope.

References

Populated places in Lasithi